Shickshinny Creek (historically known as Shickohinna) is a tributary of the Susquehanna River in the Wyoming Valley in Luzerne County, Pennsylvania, in the United States. The creek is designated as a Coldwater Fishery and a Migratory Fishery. A sawmill and a gristmill were built on the creek in 1802 and 1804, respectively. Several bridges have also been constructed over it. The creek was historically polluted by culm near its mouth, but agriculture was the main industry in the watershed in the early 1900s. It was historically used as a water supply.

The surficial geology near Shickshinny Creek mainly consists of urban land, fill, alluvium, alluvial terrace, alluvial fan, Wisconsinan Ice-Contact Stratified Drift, Wisconsinan Ice-Contact Delta, Wisconsinan Bouldery Till, Wisconsinan Till, lakes, and wetlands. The lower reaches of the creek are in a water gap between Huntington Mountain and Shickshinny Mountain. A lake known as Shickshinny Lake is in the watershed and is dammed by the Shickshinny Lake Dam.

Course

Shickshinny Creek begins in a valley in Ross Township, northwest of Sylvan Lake. It flows south for a few miles, crossing State Route 4024 and passing through two ponds. It then turns south-southwest for more than a mile, entering Union Township. At this point, the creek turns south for a short distance before turning south-southwest again and flowing through a valley known as Nevel Hollow, crossing State Route 4016 along the way. At the end of Nevel Hollow, the creek enters Shickshinny Lake, where it receives its first named tributary, Culver Creek, from the right. At the southeastern end of Shickshinny Lake, the creek flows southeast for a few miles in a valley, crossing State Route 4007. It eventually turns south for nearly a mile before turning east for a short distance. It then receives the tributary Reyburn Creek from the left and turns south, passing through the village of Koonsville and crossing Pennsylvania Route 239. The creek then turns south-southeast for approximately a mile, flowing alongside Pennsylvania Route 239 in a water gap between Huntington Mountain and Shickshinny Mountain. It enters Shickshinny and receives the tributary Little Shickshinny Creek from the right before turning east-southeast for several tenths of a mile. The creek flows through Shickshinny and crosses US Route 11 before reaching its confluence with the Susquehanna River.

Shickshinny Creek joins the Susquehanna River  upriver of its mouth.

Tributaries
Shickshinny Creek has three named tributaries, which are known as Little Shickshinny Creek, Reyburn Creek, and Culver Creek.

Hydrology and climate
Shickshinny Creek has a low level of alkalinity. The discharge of the creek at Shickshinny was measured to be 65 cubic feet per second in April 1965. The pH was 6.2 and the concentration of water hardness was 23 milligrams per liter.

In the early 1900s, Shickshinny Creek was a clear stream until  from its mouth. At this location, the Salem Breaker of the E.S. Stackhouse Coal Company drained into it via the abandoned Pennsylvania Canal. The creek contributed some culm to the Susquehanna River.

In April 1965, the concentration of carbon dioxide in the waters of Shickshinny Creek was once measured to be  milligrams per liter. The concentration of sodium was measured to be .

At the border between Union Township and Shickshinny, the peak annual discharge of Shickshinny Creek has a 10 percent chance of reaching . It has a 2 percent chance of reaching  and a 1 percent chance of reaching . The peak annual discharge has a 0.2 percent chance of reaching .

Upstream of Reyburn Creek, the peak annual discharge of Shickshinny Creek has a 10 percent chance of reaching . It has a 2 percent chance of reaching  and a 1 percent chance of reaching . The peak annual discharge has a 0.2 percent chance of reaching .

Upstream of one of its unnamed tributaries, the peak annual discharge of Shickshinny Creek has a 10 percent chance of reaching . It has a 2 percent chance of reaching  and a 1 percent chance of reaching . The peak annual discharge has a 0.2 percent chance of reaching .

In late April 1965, the water temperature of the creek was measured to be .

Geology and geography

The course of Shickshinny Creek has been described as "sinuous". The creek flows through rock formations consisting of sandstone and shale. It is situated in a gorge for a mile in its lower reaches.

The Pocono Beds are found near Shickshinny Creek, on Shickshinny Mountain. The Pocono Beds are found at the same level as the creek slightly north of Shickshinny. This may be the Mount Pleasant Formation. The Mauch Chunk Formation is also found in the watershed. Additionally, the Chemung Beds are found on parts of the creek.

In its lower reaches, the surficial geology in the vicinity of Shickshinny Creek consists of urban land highly disrupted by cut and fill, alluvium, alluvial terrace, fill, Wisconsinan Ice-Contact Stratified Drift containing stratified sand and gravel, Wisconsinan Ice-Contact Delta containing sand and gravel, Wisconsinan Bouldery Till (a glacial or resedimented till containing boulders, and bedrock consisting of sandstone and shale. The bedrock mainly occurs on the mountains in this part of the watershed. In the middle reaches of the creek, the surficial geology mainly features bedrock consisting of sandstone and shale, alluvium, and a glacial or resedimented till known as Wisconsinan Till. Some Wisconsinan Outwash and alluvial terrace is also present near Koonsville. Some patches of Wisconsinan Bouldery Till and wetlands are also present. In its upper reaches, the creek is almost entirely dominated by Wisconsinan Till, bedrock, and some lakes. However, there is a patch of alluvial fan immediately north of Shickshinny Lake and some Wisconsinan Bouldery Till and Wisconsinan Outwash not far from the creek's source.

The watershed of the tributary Little Shickshinny Creek is located in the Wyoming Coal Basin. Little Shickshinny Creek flows between Huntington Mountain and Lee Mountain. The Watsontown Axis crosses Shickshinny Creek.

The Shickshinny Creek watershed is in the Wyoming Valley. The creek is in the vicinity of Shickshinny Mountain.

A 62-foot-deep well in the Shickshinny Creek water gap was once noted by Newport to produce  of water per minute.

Watershed
It is located in the northwestern part of Luzerne County and the northeastern part of Columbia County. The mouth of the creek is in the United States Geological Survey quadrangle of Shickshinny. However, its source is in the quadrangle of Sweet Valley.

The lower reaches of the watershed of Shickshinny Creek mostly consist of mountains. The upper reaches of the watershed consist of hills, swamps, and lakes. The communities of Muhlenburg and Shickshinny are in the creek's watershed.

A lake known as Shickshinny Lake is in the watershed of Shickshinny Creek. The lake is dammed by the Shickshinny Lake Dam. It is covered in grass on both sides, with some riprap also occurring on its north side. A 1980 inspection found its spillway to be "inadequate", but lacking "major deficiencies". However, there was some seepage and erosion.

Shickshinny Creek is the main source of flooding in Union Township and one of the main sources of flooding in Shickshinny. The creek's discharge in southern Union Township approached .

History and etymology
Shickshinny Creek was entered into the Geographic Names Information System on August 2, 1979. Its identifier in the Geographic Names Information System is 1187507. The origin of the creek's name is unknown, but it may be an Anglicized corruption of the word Schigi-hanna, which is itself a rough translation of "fine creek".

The first sawmill in Union Township, Luzerne County was built by Isaac Benscotter in 1802. The first gristmill in the township was built on the creek by George Gregory in 1804. The Search brothers built a number of mills on Shickshinny Creek in 1858. They included a sawmill, a flour mill, a plaster mill, and a brickyard and were collectively known as the Shickshinny Mills or Search's Mills.

A turnpike was built through the Shickshinny Creek gap in 1877. A number of bridges have been constructed over the creek. A concrete tee beam bridge carrying Pennsylvania Route 239 over the creek was constructed in 1925. A steel stringer/multi-beam or girder bridge was built over the creek in 1930 and renovated in the 2010s. A bridge of the same type, but carrying State Route 4007, was built in Union Township in 1940. A concrete tee beam bridge carrying that road over the creek was built in 1965.

The Shickshinny Water Company used a stream in the Shickshinny Creek watershed as a water supply in the early 1900s. Little Shickshinny Creek has been used as a water supply for Shickshinny, as well as Mocanaqua. Agriculture has been a significant industry in the watershed in the past. The streams of the watershed also power small mills.

In 1996,  of oil leaked from a pipe into Shickshinny Creek, but there was no major environmental damage.

Biology
The main stem of Shickshinny Creek is designated as a Coldwater Fishery and a Migratory Fishery. The tributaries Reyburn Creek and Culver Creek, as well as several unnamed streams in the watershed, also hold these designations. However, the tributary Little Shickshinny Creek is designated as a High-Quality Coldwater Fishery and a Migratory Fishery. Wild trout naturally reproduce in Shickshinny Creek from its headwaters downstream to its mouth.

The tributary Little Shickshinny Creek is listed on the Columbia County Natural Areas Inventory. The area in its vicinity contains habitats such as a Hemlock Palustrine Forest Natural Community, a red maple swamp, a dry oak-heath forest, a highbush blueberry shrub
swamp, and a reservoir.

See also
 Paddy Run, next tributary of the Susquehanna River going downriver
 Hunlock Creek, next tributary of the Susquehanna River going upriver
 List of rivers of Pennsylvania

Notes

References

External links

 Google Street View image of Shickshinny Creek

Rivers of Pennsylvania
Rivers of Luzerne County, Pennsylvania
Tributaries of the Susquehanna River